Racer or The Racer or Racers may refer to:

Snakes
 Alsophis, endemic to the Lesser Antilles in the Caribbean
 Eastern racer, Coluber constrictor, endemic to North America and Central America
 Cubophis, found in the northwestern Caribbean
 Drymobius, neotropical racers, endemic to the Americas
 Hispaniola racer (Haitiophis anomalus), endemic to Hispaniola
 Hypsirhynchus, found on Jamaica, Hispaniola, and the Bahamas
 Ialtris, endemic to Hispaniola
 Masticophis, whip snakes or coachwhips,  endemic to the Americas
 Galapagos racer (Pseudalsophis biserialis), endemic to the Galapagos Islands

Arts and entertainment

Fictional entities
 The Racer family and Racer Motors, a fictional family and company in the Speed Racer universe

Film and television
 Racers (film), a 1972 Soviet drama 
The Racers, 1955 film based on the Hans Ruesch novel
 The Racer (film), a 2022 sports drama
The Racers, working title for the 1961 TV series Straightaway by Racer Productions

Gaming and toys
 Star Wars Episode I: Racer, a 1999 video game
 Lego Racers, a product line of the Lego construction toy
 Lego Racers (video game), 1999 
 Racer (simulator), a freeware video game simulator

Literature
The Racer, 1953 novel by Hans Ruesch
"The Racer", 1958 story by Ib Melchior, basis of the 1975 film Death Race 2000
 Racer (magazine), an automobile racing magazine

Roller coasters and slides
 West Coast Racers, roller coaster at Six Flags Magic Mountain, U.S.
 Racer (Kennywood), a wooden racing roller coaster at Kennywood Park, U.S.
 The Racer (Kings Island), a wooden racing roller coaster at Kings Island , U.S.
 The Racer, 82m water slide at Big Banana, Coff's Coast, Australia
 Racer, a former Cedar Point attraction, U.S.

Transportation

Aircraft
 Hughes H-1 Racer, a racing aircraft first flown in 1935
 AMSOIL Racer, a 1980s racing aircraft
 Bristol Racer, a British racing monoplane, first flown in 1922
 Brown B-1 Racer, an American 1930s racing monoplane
 Brown B-2 Racer, an American racing monoplane built in 1934
 Dayton-Wright RB-1 Racer, an American racing monoplane first flown in 1920
 Graham-Perren Racer, a racing aircraft built to compete in the 1934 National Air Races
 Napier-Heston Racer, a 1940s British racing monoplane
 Powell PH Racer, a 1920s racing aircraft
 Verville-Packard R-1 Racer, a miltary racing aircraft first flown in 1919
 Verville-Sperry R-3 Racer, a racing monoplane first flown in 1922
 Westland Racer, a British racing monoplane first flown in 1926
 Air Creation Racer, a French ultralight trike design 1986–2010
 Apollo Racer GT, a Hungarian ultralight trike design
 Corvus Racer 540, a Hungarian high performance aerobatic aircraft
 Airbus RACER, an 2017 experimental high-speed compound helicopter

Ships
 , the name of several Royal Navy ships
 Racer-class sloop
 , the name of two US Navy ships
 Racer, later

Other transportation
 Daewoo Racer, a variant of the Daewoo LeMans compact car 
 Racer, original name of GWR 3031 Class locomotive Glenside

Sports
 The Racer's Group, an American car racing team 
 Akron Racers, an American women's softball club
 Elgin Racers, an American basketball team
 Harringay Racers, various British ice hockey clubs
 Harringay Racers (speedway), an English motorcycle speedway team 1947–1954
 Indianapolis Racers, an American hockey team 1974–1978
 London Racers, a British ice hockey club
 Murray State Racers, the sports teams of Murray State University, U.S.
 Murrayfield Racers, a former Scottish ice hockey team 
 Murrayfield Racers (2018)
 Reading Racers, an English motorcycle speedway team
 Tri-City Racers, a former American Basketball Association team

Other uses
 LZR Racer, a line of Speedo swimsuits
 ZTE Racer, a mobile phone
 RACER Trust, to dispose of General Motors' abandoned real estate

See also

 Racing (disambiguation)
 Racer X (disambiguation)
 RACER IV, a component of hydrogen bombs made by the United States